Valdepares is one of eight parishes (administrative divisions) in the El Franco municipality, within the province and autonomous community of Asturias, in northern Spain.

The population is 695 (INE 2007).

Villages and hamlets
 El Franco
 Viavélez
 Mernes
 Porcía
 El Porto
 A Ronda
 San Polayo
 Valdepares

References

Parishes in El Franco